Shahrooei (Shahruei) (also Romanized as Shahrū’ī; also known as Sharū’ī) is a village in Dodangeh Rural District, in the Central District of Behbahan County, Khuzestan Province, Iran. At the 2006 census, its population was 1,951, in 419 families.

References 

Populated places in Behbahan County